Fawn Yacker is an American filmmaker, producer, and cinematographer. She also co-found the LGBT organization "The Last Closet".

About 
In 2009, she co-wrote, co-produced and co-directed with director Dee Mosbacher a one-hour documentary film entitled Training Rules, about the controversial women's basketball program ran by Rene Portland at Pennsylvania State University collegiate sports. Fawn Yacker is a founding member of The Nuclear Beauty Parlor.

She co-founded the LGBT organization "The Last Closet", with the goal of ending homophobia in men's professional athletics and providing support.

Filmography

Director
2009: Training Rules - co-director with Dee Mosbacher

Producer
2000: That's a Family - co-producer with Debra Chasnoff, and Ariella J. Ben-Dov.
2009: Training Rules - co-producer with Dee Mosbacher

Cinematographer
1983: Sippie
1987: Chuck Solomon: Coming of Age 
1989: Sacred Passion (V) 
1991: Deadly Deception: General Electric, Nuclear Weapons and Our Environment 
1993: Sex Is... 
1996: It's Elementary: Talking About Gay Issues in School
2006: Let's Get Real
2005: Waging a Living
2007: It's Still Elementary (V) (aka It's Still Elementary: The Movie and the Movement 
2009: Training Rules
2009: Straightlaced: How Gender's Got Us All Tied Up

References

External links
 

American documentary filmmakers
Living people
Year of birth missing (living people)
Place of birth missing (living people)